Psychedelic Moods is the debut album by the American psychedelic rock band, The Deep, and was released on Cameo-Parkway Records in October 1966 (see 1966 in music). The album was one of the first pieces to produce a consistent psychedelic theme throughout the whole LP. All of the material featured was originally composed by the band. Despite the conflicting dates, it is generally considered the first album to use the term "psychedelic" in its title.

Background

Rusty Evans, the founder of the Deep, marketed a proposal to Mark Barkan to produce an album that musically replicated the experience an individual was exposed to while under the influence of LSD. This genre, psychedelic rock, had yet to surface in the wide variety of musical acts it would later encompass shortly after the album's release. Barkan accepted the offer, and Evans assembled the Deep, a studio-only group that included guitarist, David Bromberg. Shortly afterwards, Barkan had the band signed to Cameo-Parkway Records to record the album.

The Deep completed the Psychedelic Moods album in its entirety at Cameo-Parkway Studios, Philadelphia in a two-day process that commenced on August 19, and concluded on August 20, 1966. On a budget of $1,200, a considerably lower margin than what was usually funded for a typical album, the band co-produced the sessions with Barkan. From New York City, the Deep traveled to Philadelphia to record the album. Six songs were previously written before the move, with six additional compositions being penned along the way to the studio to provide enough material for a full LP. Recording took place in a darkened studio, reportedly while the group was under the influence of LSD. Numerous sound effects were utilized, including, at the suggestion of Barkan, sexual moans recorded in the background. The overall sound of the tracks have been described as "very strange, full of weird sound effects, haunting vocals, and acid-soaked lyrics". With the sessions becoming increasingly erratic, the drummer unexpectedly departed, but the instrumentals were complete, so further drum tracks did not have to be recorded. Following the drummer's exit, fuzz reverse guitar, chimes, and abnormal bullfrog sounds were overdubbed onto the tracks.

Following the completion of the album, Barkan's lawyer sent the tapes to Dick James, publisher of The Beatles. James made an offer for the rights to distribute the album, but the band declined on the assumption it would become a hit. Upon its October 1966 release, Psychedelic Moods failed to achieve the success the band anticipated. The lack of copies sold was, in part, due to the unforeseen success of Question Mark and the Mysterians' hit, "96 Tears", and Cameo-Parkway Records' poor circulation of the album. Over time, the album has garnered interest for being an early example of psychedelic music. In addition, despite the conflicting release dates, Psychedelic Moods is considered to have been the first album to have the word "psychedelic" in its title. A month after the album's distribution, The Blues Magoos, and The 13th Floor Elevators also released albums with the same phrase featured in the title. Collectables Records released the album in 1996 as a part of a series of outtakes, and previously unreleased material focusing on the Deep.

Track listing

"Color Dreams" 2:39
"Pink Ether" 2:23
"When Rain Is Black" 2:13
"It's All a Part of Me" 2:57
"Turned On" 2:28
"Psychedelic Moon" 2:45
"Shadows on the Wall" 3:15
"Crystal Nite" 1:43
"Trip #76" 2:39
"Wake Up and Find Me" 2:22
"Your Choice to Choose" 1:55
"On Off - Off On" 2:24

Personnel

Note: The personnel have been identified, but no source confirms all of their roles in the album.

 Rusty Evans - lead vocals, lead guitar
 David Bromberg - rhythm guitar, bass guitar, backing vocals
 Mark Barkan - percussion, backing vocals
 David Richard Blackhurst
 Caroline Blue
 Arthur Geller
 Lenny Pogan

References

1966 debut albums
The Deep (band) albums